Justin Skinner (born 30 January 1969) is a former English footballer who played for Fulham, Bristol Rovers, Walsall, Hibernian, Dunfermline Athletic and Brechin City.

He began his career at Fulham and played over 150 games for the club, before moving to Bristol Rovers in 1991 for £130,000—where he remained until 1998. He later played for Scottish clubs Hibernian, Dunfermline and Brechin City before retiring from playing in 2005.

Management
Skinner worked at both Chelsea's and Queens Park Rangers' youth academies before becoming QPR's reserve team manager in June 2006. He then became assistant manager at Lewes, helping them to win the Conference South championship in 2008. Skinner signed a two-year contract to become assistant manager at Farnborough in 2009.

References

External links

1969 births
Brechin City F.C. players
Bristol Rovers F.C. players
Dunfermline Athletic F.C. players
English footballers
Association football midfielders
Fulham F.C. players
Hibernian F.C. players
Living people
Scottish Football League players
Scottish Premier League players
English Football League players
Walsall F.C. players